Multitudes is the upcoming sixth studio album by Canadian singer-songwriter Feist. It will be released on April 14, 2023, by Polydor Records. It is Feist's first album since Pleasure (2017). Three songs from Multitudes were released simultaneously with the album announcement: "Hiding Out in the Open", "In Lightning", and "Love Who We Are Meant To".

Background
Work on Multitudes began following the birth of Feist's adopted daughter in 2019 and the death of her father. She recorded the songs while embarking on her live residency of the same name throughout 2021 and 2022. In a press release, Feist explained the recording process and the inspiration behind the album: "The last few years were such a period of confrontation for me, and it feels like it was at least to some degree for everyone. We confronted ourselves as much as our relationships confronted us. It felt like our relational ecosystems were clearer than ever and so whatever was normally obscured — like a certain way of avoiding conflict or a certain way of talking around the subject — were all of a sudden thrust into the light. And in all that reassessment, the chance to find footing on healthier, more honest ground became possible, and the effort to maintain avoidance actually felt like it took more effort than just handing ourselves over to the truth."

Track listing

References

2023 albums
Feist (singer) albums
Upcoming albums